Piero Vaglio (born 12 February 1888, date of death unknown) was an Italian wrestler. He competed in the Greco-Roman featherweight event at the 1920 Summer Olympics.

References

External links
 

1888 births
Year of death missing
Olympic wrestlers of Italy
Wrestlers at the 1920 Summer Olympics
Italian male sport wrestlers
Place of birth missing